Malekoppa is a village in the Koppal district of Karnataka state, India.

See also
Lakkundi
Halligudi
Kuknoor
Koppal

References

Villages in Koppal district